Allen Foster Cooper (June 16, 1862 – April 20, 1917) was a Republican member of the U.S. House of Representatives from Pennsylvania.

Allen Foster Cooper was born in Franklin Township, Fayette County, Pennsylvania. He graduated from the State Normal School in California, Pennsylvania in 1881. He attended Mount Union College in Alliance, Ohio, in 1883.  After this he taught for six years in public schools.

Cooper graduated from the law department of the University of Michigan at Ann Arbor, Michigan in 1888. He was admitted to the bar in 1888, and commenced practice in Uniontown, Pennsylvania.

Cooper was elected as a Republican to the Fifty-eighth and to the three succeeding Congresses. After his time in Congress, he resumed business and the practice of law in Uniontown.

References

The Political Graveyard

1862 births
1917 deaths
People from Fayette County, Pennsylvania
Pennsylvania lawyers
People from Uniontown, Pennsylvania
University of Mount Union alumni
California University of Pennsylvania alumni
University of Michigan Law School alumni
Republican Party members of the United States House of Representatives from Pennsylvania
19th-century American politicians
19th-century American lawyers